George Samuel Ranglin (28 October 1902 – after 1972) was a Jamaican politician. He was President of the Senate of Jamaica from 7 December 1962 – 1972. He was born in Mandeville, Jamaica.

See also
List of presidents of the Senate of Jamaica

References

1902 births
Year of death missing
Members of the Senate of Jamaica